Klára Kubičková, (born Kucserová 16 August 1936 – 25 November 2022) was a Slovak architectural historian. In 2020, she was awarded the Pribina cross by the president of Slovakia Zuzana Čaputová.

Life 
Kubíčková was born in Levice. From 1953 to 1959, she studied at the Faculty of Arts, Charles University, and Institute of Art History of the Czech Academy of Sciences. She worked at the Slovak Institute of Monument Care in Banská Bystrica  From 1987 to 1992 , she worked at the Slovak National Gallery. She was  chairwoman of DOCOMOMO Slovakia Klará.

In 2012, with the architect Igor Teplan, she founded the László Hudec Architect Center (CALEH no).

References 

Architectural historians
1936 births
2022 deaths
People from Levice
Charles University alumni